Mount Buller was named in 1922 after  Lieutenant Colonel H.C. Buller DSO, a casualty of World War I.  It is located in the Kananaskis Range in Alberta.


Geology

Buller is composed of sedimentary rock laid down during the Precambrian to Jurassic periods. Formed in shallow seas, this sedimentary rock was pushed east and over the top of younger rock during the Laramide orogeny.

Climate

Based on the Köppen climate classification, Buller is located in a subarctic climate with cold, snowy winters, and mild summers. Precipitation runoff from the mountain drains west into Spray Lakes Reservoir.

See also
 Geography of Alberta

References

Buller
Alberta's Rockies